William Wells (June 10, 1907 – November 12, 1985), known professionally as Dicky Wells (sometimes Dickie Wells), was an American jazz trombonist.

Career
Dickie Wells is believed to have been born on June 10, 1907 in Centerville, Tennessee, United States. His brother was trombonist Henry Wells. He moved to New York City in 1926, and became a member of the Lloyd Scott band.

He played with Count Basie between 1938–1945 and 1947–1950. He also played with Cecil Scott, Spike Hughes, Fletcher Henderson, Benny Carter, Teddy Hill, Jimmy Rushing, Buck Clayton and Ray Charles.  In the middle years of the 1960s, Wells toured and performed extensively, and the onset of alcoholism caused him  personal problems which led to his semi-retirement.  Publication of his autobiography in 1973 helped to steer Wells back to his profession.

In his later years, Wells suffered a severe beating during a mugging that affected his memory, but he recovered and continued to perform. He played frequently at the West End jazz club at 116th and Broadway, most often with a band called The Countsmen, led by alto saxophonist Earle Warren, his colleague from Count Basie days. A trademark was Wells's "pepper pot" mute which he made himself.

Death

He died of cancer on November 12, 1985, in New York City. Shortly after his death, Wells's family donated his trombone to the Rutgers University Institute of Jazz Studies.

Discography

As leader
 Bones for the King (Felsted, 1958)
 Trombone Four-in-Hand (Felsted, 1959)
 Chatter Jazz with Rex Stewart (RCA Victor, 1959) 
 Heavy Duty! (Vocalion, 1965)
 Dicky Wells in Paris 1937 (Prestige, 1968)
 Lonesome Road (Uptown, 1981)
 The Stanley Dance Sessions (Lone Hill, 2005)
 Dicky Wells with the Alex Welsh Band (Jazzology, 2011)

As sideman
With Count Basie
 Blues by Basie (Columbia, 1956)
 The Count (RCA Camden, 1958)
 The Count Swings Out (Coral, 1959)

With Buck Clayton
 Songs for Swingers (Columbia, 1959)
 Goin' to Kansas City (Riverside, 1960) 
 One for Buck (Columbia, 1962)
 Copenhagen Concert (SteepleChase, 1979)

With Jimmy Rushing
 The Jazz Odyssey of Jimmy Rushing (Philips, 1957)
 Little Jimmy Rushing and the Big Brass (Columbia, 1958)
 Every Day I Have the Blues (Bluesway, 1967)
 Livin' the Blues (Bluesway, 1968)

With others
 Vic Dickenson & Joe Thomas, Mainstream (Atlantic, 1958)
 Dizzy Gillespie, The Complete RCA Victor Recordings (Bluebird, 1995)
 Tommy Gwaltney, Goin' to Kansas City (Riverside, 1960)
 Nancy Harrow, Wild Women Don't Have the Blues (Candid, 1961)
 John Lee Hooker, It Serve You Right to Suffer (Impulse!, 1966)
 Spike Hughes, Spike Hughes and His All American Orchestra (London 1933 1956)
 Frankie Laine & Buck Clayton, Jazz Spectacular (Columbia, 1956)
 Jay McShann, The Big Apple Bash (Atlantic, 1979)
 Red Prysock, Fruit Boots  (Mercury, 1957)
 Rex Stewart, Henderson Homecoming (United Artists, 1959)
 Buddy Tate, Swinging Like Tate (Felsted, 1958)

References

External links
 1974 interview

1907 births
1985 deaths
20th-century American musicians
American jazz trombonists
Male trombonists
Count Basie Orchestra members
People from Centerville, Tennessee
Swing trombonists
African-American jazz musicians
20th-century trombonists
American male jazz musicians
Uptown Records (jazz) artists
20th-century American male musicians